Aisha Orazbayeva (born 1985) is a violinist from Kazakhstan. She also writes and has had plays broadcast on the radio. She gained notice for her performance of Salvatore Sciarrino caprices.

Orazbayeva collaborated with computer music composer Peter Zinovieff on a violin concerto Our Too, premiered at London Contemporary Music Festival in 2014.

In 2014 composer Bryn Harrison wrote Receiving the Approaching Memory, a 40-minute work for violin and piano, for Orazbayeva and pianist Mark Knoop. An album version was released in 2015.

References

External links 

Women classical violinists
Kazakhstani classical violinists
1985 births
Living people
21st-century women musicians
21st-century classical violinists
21st-century Kazakhstani women